Jaqua is a surname. Notable people with the surname include:

Ernest Jaqua (1882–1972), American academic
Jon Jaqua (born 1948), American football player
Nate Jaqua (born 1981), American soccer player, son of Jon

See also
Jaqua, California, alternate name of Iaqua, California
Jaqua Township, Cheyenne County, Kansas